Nuestra Senora de Luz Church and Cemetery (Our Lady of Light Catholic Church; Canoncito Church) is a historic church building 13 miles southeast of Santa Fe, north of Interstate 25 frontage road in Canoncito, New Mexico.  It was built in 1880 and added to the National Register of Historic Places in 1995.

It is a small, one-story, adobe chapel.  It has also been known as Our Lady of Light Catholic Church and as Canoncito Church.

See also

 National Register of Historic Places listings in Santa Fe County, New Mexico

References

External links
 

Roman Catholic churches in New Mexico
Churches on the National Register of Historic Places in New Mexico
Roman Catholic churches completed in 1880
Churches in Santa Fe County, New Mexico
National Register of Historic Places in Santa Fe County, New Mexico
Cemeteries on the National Register of Historic Places in New Mexico
19th-century Roman Catholic church buildings in the United States